Nyctemera kebeae is a moth of the family Erebidae first described by George Thomas Bethune-Baker in 1904. It is found on New Guinea.

Subspecies
Nyctemera kebeae kebeae (Papua New Guinea: Owen Stanley Range)
Nyctemera kebeae intermedia de Vos, 1997 (Irian Jaya: Star Mountains, north of the Baliem Valley)
Nyctemera kebeae occidentalis de Vos, 1997 (Irian Jaya: Snow Mountains, Weyland Mountains, Wissel Lakes)

References

Nyctemerina
Moths described in 1904